Owen Holland is a professor of cognitive robotics (Informatics) in the Sackler Centre for Consciousness Science at the University of Sussex. He was until recently a professor of computer science at the University of Essex, England. Previously, he has held faculty positions at Caltech, University of Bielefeld, Starlab and the University of the West of England.

Holland is best known for his work in biologically-inspired robotics, where he has contributed to the theory and practice of collective robotics, ant algorithms and machine consciousness, among other sub-fields. Some of the projects he has been involved in have attracted attention from the media, notably the Slugbot project, which aimed to produce a robotic predator capable of sustaining its energy levels from hunting and digesting slugs.

For the last ten years he has mainly been interested in the prospects for building a conscious machine. In 2001 he was an organiser and session chair for one of the first symposia on machine consciousness, and in 2003 he edited a special issue of the Journal of Consciousness Studies  on the topic. In 2004 he obtained the first major funding for a machine consciousness project which investigated whether a human-like robot with a self-model and a world-model might exhibit features characteristic of consciousness. The robot, CRONOS, is now being further developed in a European project ECCEROBOT led by Owen, which will run from 2009 – 2011. Holland has been an active contributor to most of the machine consciousness symposia held in the last decade, and serves on the editorial board of the International Journal of Machine Consciousness.

References

External links
 Owen Holland's research page at the University of Essex
 Faculty at the Sackler Centre for Consciousness Science

British computer scientists
Academics of the University of Essex
Academics of the University of the West of England, Bristol
Living people
Year of birth missing (living people)
Academics of the University of Sussex
California Institute of Technology faculty